Tim was born July 20, 1986 in Atlanta, Georgia. He is a professional sailor and America's Cup Grinder and currently lives in Halifax, Canada.  He competed with American Magic in the 36th America's cup.

Prior to his sailing career he was as an American sprint canoeist. At the 2012 Summer Olympics, he competed in the Men's K-1 200 metres.

Hornsby qualified through a long and difficult route.  He won the Men’s K1 200m event at the 2011 Sprint National Championships in Gainesville, Georgia. on August 6. However, US teammate Ryan Dolan had achieved the result that gave the US an Olympic canoeing quota slot for the U.S. at the 2011 Pan American Games in Guadalajara, Mexico on October 28.

Hornsby then won the 2012 U.S. Olympic Team Trials in Oklahoma City on April 20, forcing a race-off between the two at the first two 2012 World Cups. Hornsby then achieved a 14th-place finish at the 2012 World Cup No. 2 in Duisburg, Germany on May 27, clinching the US K-1 200 m Olympic place for himself as his result was better than Dolan's.

Hornsby's home club is the Lanier Canoe and Kayak Club.    Lake Lanier hosted the canoe, kayak and rowing events at the Atlanta Olympics, but Hornsby is the first Olympian they have produced.

Kayak Career Highlights
 2016 USA Olympic Trials in Gainesville, Georgia: 1st in K1 200m
 2015 World Cup: 8th in K1-200m
 2014 World Championships: 11th in K1 200M
 2013 World Cup No. 2: 6th in K1 200m
 2013 U.S. National Team Trials in Oklahoma City, Okla.: 1st in K1 200m
 2012 U.S. Olympic Team Trials: 1st in K1 200m
 2011 Pan American Games: 5th in K2 200m 
 2011 World Cup No. 3: 14th in K2 200m
 2011 National Championships: 1st K1 200m
 2010 Vichy World Cup: 11th in K1 200m
 2008 Olympic training partner
 2008 USA Olympic Trials in Oklahoma, City: 1st K2 500m, 1st K4 1000m
 2008 Szeged World Cup: 4th in K1 200m, 8th in K2 500m, 8th in K2 1000m
 2006 Pan American Championships: 3rd in K1 200m
 2004 Olympic Trials: 4th K4 1000m
 2003 Jr. World Championships: 11th K2-1000m

References

American male canoeists
Living people
Olympic canoeists of the United States
Canoeists at the 2012 Summer Olympics
1986 births
People from Atlanta
2021 America's Cup sailors
American Magic